This is a list of television programs currently and formerly broadcast by ETV Bal Bharat.The channel was launched on 27 April 2021. The channel focuses on action and teens. The channel primarily airs anime and animated content from worldwide.

Current programming
 Abhimanyu - The Young Yodha
 Avatar: The Last Airbender
 Bal Bahubali
 Dora
 Jing-Ju Cats
 Kitty Is Not a Cat
 Loopidoo - the Animated Series
 Ninja
 Olobob Top
 Pandeyji Pehelwan
 Peter Pan
 Robinhood
 The Jungle Book
 The Sisters
 Winx Club
 Wow! Wow! Wubbzy!

Former programming
 Arthur and the Children of the Round Table
 Charile Chaplin And Company
 Chotu Lambu and Robu
 Kong: King Of The Apes
 The Mysterious Cities of Gold
 Pac-Man and the Ghostly Adventures
 Pleasant Goat and Big Big Wolf
 Super Monsters
 Teenage Mutant Ninja Turtles (2012 TV series)
 The Rising Sun - Stories of Great Personalities
 The Rising Sun - Stories of Mythological Heroes
 The Smurfs (1981 TV series)
 Three Squirrels
 Timo Fairyland
 Tin and Tan
 Tree House Stories
 Wisdom Tree - Moral Stories

Movies
 Salma's Big Wish
 Loopdidoo : Treasure of Captain Nem Bones
 Captain Morten and the Spider Queen
 Winx Club 3D: Magical Adventure
 Ballerina (2016 film)
 Jack and the Cuckoo-Clock Heart
 Free Birds
 The Snow Queen (2012 film)
 Winx Club: The Secret of the Lost Kingdom
 Micropolis
 Space Dogs
 Loopdidoo's Incredible Christmas
 Dinofroz : The Origin
 Winx Club: The Mystery of the Abyss
 The Wheelers
 The Snow Queen 2
 Winx Club : Revenge of The Trix
 Gormiti All for One
 Monsters and pirates
 Dinofroz : Return to the past world
 Winx club: Bloom's Fate
 Magic Sport 2
 Virus attack
 Gormiti The fifth stone
 Winx Club : The battle for Magix
 Mother Teresa
 Winx Club : The shadow of Phoenix
 Dinofroz : An island in the sky
 Dino Time
 The Magic Snowflake
 Valley of the Lanterns
 Angel's friends
 Dive Olly Dive
 Sindbad
 Frozen in time
 Howard Lovecraft and the Frozen Kingdom
 Howard Lovecraft and the Undersea Kingdom
 Howard Lovecraft and the Kingdom of Madness
 Maya and the bee
 Sheep and Wolves

References

Lists of television series by network